Manifest destiny was a widely held belief in the United States that its settlers were destined to expand across North America.

Manifest Destiny may also refer to:

Music
 Manifest Destiny (opera), a 2003 opera by Keith Burstein
 Manifest Destiny (Brand X album), 1997
 Manifest Destiny (The Dictators album)
 "Manifest Destiny/Sorority Tears", a 2006 song by Guster
 "Manifest Destiny" (Jamiroquai song), 1994
 "Manifest Destiny", a 1988 song by Dirty Rotten Imbeciles from the album 4 of a Kind

Other
 "Manifest Destiny" (The Outer Limits), an episode of the TV series The Outer Limits
 X-Men: Manifest Destiny, a 2008 storyline involving the X-Men
 Wolverine: Manifest Destiny, four-issue limited series
 Manifest Destiny, a 2016 comic book by Chris Dingess; see